Events from the year 1730 in Ireland.

Incumbent
Monarch: George II

Events
First bridge across the River Foyle linking Lifford and Strabane is built.
First turnpike act for Ireland, for improvement of the road from Dublin to Kilcullen Bridge.
Edward Lovett Pearce succeeds Thomas Burgh as Surveyor General of Ireland.

Births
James Alexander, 1st Earl of Caledon, merchant, landlord and politician (d. 1802)
Approximate date
Thomas Barton, missionary clergyman (d. 1780)
Theophilus Blakeney, politician (d. 1813)

Deaths

January 29 – Thomas Flynn, Roman Catholic Bishop of Ardagh
August 6 – Sir Thomas Vesey, 1st Baronet, Church of Ireland Bishop of Ossory (b. 1668?)
October 3 – Thomas Brodrick, politician (b. 1654)
December 4 – Edward Southwell, politician (b. 1671)
December 18 – Colonel Thomas Burgh, Surveyor General of Ireland (b. 1670)

References

 
Years of the 18th century in Ireland
Ireland
1730s in Ireland